Athol Railton Richardson  (15 May 1897 – 22 May 1982) was an Australian politician and judge. Richardson represented the Electoral district of Ashfield for the United Australia Party and the Liberal Party from 11 May 1935 until 5 February 1952.

Early life
Richardson was born to parents Stephen Arthur Richardson, a Salvation Army officer, and mother Elizabeth Sarah Urquhart in Newcastle, New South Wales. Richardson jnr served in World War I in the 2nd and 4th squadrons of the Australian Flying Corps in France from 1917 till 1919. He married Isabel McCrea Watson on 23 February 1928 and had one daughter and one son.

Political career
Richardson entered politics by contesting and winning the Electoral district of Ashfield for the United Australia Party at the 1935 election. He was subsequently re-elected to the seat of Ashfield at the 1938, 1941 and 1944 elections. He resigned to unsuccessfully contest the federal seat of Parkes in 1946. He regained Ashfield at the subsequent by-election and retained it at the 1947 and 1950 elections.

During his time in parliament he held various ministerial portfolio's including Minister for Social Services (13 October 1938 – 5 August 1939), Minister for Health (22 February 1939 – 30 June 1939), Minister for Labour and Industry (26 June 1939 – 5 August 1939) and Treasurer (16 August 1939 – 16 May 1941). He was also Deputy Leader of the Opposition for 1941 until 1945.

Richardson retired from politics upon his appointment as a Judge of the Supreme Court in 1952. During his judicial tenure, Richardson remained a member of the Liberal Party; Tom Hughes  describes him as a man of 'orderly habits', but criticises him as 'a well-meaning man who gained marks only for sincerity and effort'. Richardson retired from the bench in 1967.

Death and honours
Richardson died on 22 May 1982, at Darling Point, New South Wales, Australia.

Honours received
 King's Counsel in 1951.
 Officer Order of the British Empire (OBE) in 1976.
 Hon LLD New York 1968.

References

 

1897 births
1982 deaths
Australian barristers
Australian World War I pilots
Australian military personnel of World War I
Australian King's Counsel
Judges of the Supreme Court of New South Wales
Australian Officers of the Order of the British Empire
20th-century King's Counsel
United Australia Party members of the Parliament of New South Wales
Liberal Party of Australia members of the Parliament of New South Wales
Members of the New South Wales Legislative Assembly
Treasurers of New South Wales
20th-century Australian politicians